Farlowella gracilis is a species of armored catfish endemic to Colombia where it is found in the Caqueta River basin.  This species grows to a length of  SL.

References
 

gracilis
Catfish of South America
Freshwater fish of Colombia
Endemic fauna of Colombia
Fish described in 1904